Stephen Lambert (born 21 December 1979) is a field hockey goalkeeper from Australia, who was first selected to play for The Kookaburras at the Four Nations International Challenge in June 2002. Lambert, nicknamed 'Lambo, lambot and Rexy throughout his professional career, claimed a Commonwealth Games gold medal in Manchester (2002). Stephen is married to Hockeyroos player Angie Skirving as of December 2006.

International tournaments
 2002 – Commonwealth Games, Manchester (1st)
 2003 – Champions Trophy, Amstelveen (2nd)
 2005 – Champions Trophy, Chennai (1st)
 2006 – Commonwealth Games, Melbourne (1st)

External links
 
 Profile on Hockey Australia
 Waverley Hockey Club - Stephen Lamberts Melbourne Club

1979 births
Sportspeople from Mackay, Queensland
Australian male field hockey players
Living people
Male field hockey goalkeepers
Olympic field hockey players of Australia
Olympic bronze medalists for Australia
Field hockey players at the 2002 Commonwealth Games
Field hockey players at the 2006 Commonwealth Games
2006 Men's Hockey World Cup players
Field hockey players at the 2008 Summer Olympics
Commonwealth Games gold medallists for Australia
Olympic medalists in field hockey
Medalists at the 2008 Summer Olympics
Commonwealth Games medallists in field hockey
Medallists at the 2002 Commonwealth Games
Medallists at the 2006 Commonwealth Games